Sergey Usenya (born 4 March 1988) is a Belarusian professional footballer who plays for Smorgon.

Honours
Alashkert
Armenian Premier League champion: 2015–16

References

External links
 
 
 Profile at Gorodeya website

1988 births
Living people
Footballers from Minsk
Belarusian footballers
Association football defenders
Belarusian expatriate footballers
Expatriate footballers in Armenia
FC BATE Borisov players
FC Volna Pinsk players
FC Belshina Bobruisk players
FC Baranovichi players
FC Rudziensk players
FC Torpedo-BelAZ Zhodino players
FC Gorodeya players
FC Alashkert players
FC Dynamo Brest players
FC Smorgon players